The 2013 North Texas Mean Green football team represented the University of North Texas during the 2013 NCAA Division I FBS football season. The team was led by third-year head coach Dan McCarney and played its home games at Apogee Stadium. It was the Mean Green's first season as members of Conference USA, competing in the West Division. The team earned a 9-4 record (6-2 in conference) and won the 2014 Heart of Dallas Bowl. Additionally, it set a school record for average home attendance per game at 21,030. The defense was notable for being statistically the best second half defense in the Football Bowl Subdivision. It received two top 25 votes in the Coaches' Poll to end the season.

The team began the season with a 2-3 record in its first five games before going on a five-game winning streak, culminating in a win against the Rice Owls, which was televised on Fox Sports 1. After losing to the UTSA Roadrunners, the Mean Green were eliminated from conference championship contention. After defeating the Tulsa Golden Hurricane to end the regular season, the Mean Green defeated the UNLV Rebels in the Heart of Dallas Bowl. The bowl game win gave the Mean Green their best season and first bowl win since 2002 and their first winning season since 2004.

Schedule

Schedule Source:

Game summaries

Idaho

at Ohio

Ball State

at Georgia

at Tulane

Middle Tennessee

at Louisiana Tech

at Southern Miss

Rice

With the win, the Mean Green became bowl eligible for the 2013 season.

UTEP

This game is notable for being the second highest attended game at Apogee Stadium.

UTSA

at Tulsa

vs. UNLV (Heart of Dallas Bowl)

References

North Texas
North Texas Mean Green football seasons
First Responder Bowl champion seasons
North Texas Mean Green football